Compactification may refer to:
 Compactification (mathematics), making a topological space compact
 Compactification (physics), the "curling up" of extra dimensions in string theory

See also
 Compaction (disambiguation)